The Young Mania Rating Scale (YMRS), developed by Vincent E Ziegler and popularised by Robert Young, is an eleven-item multiple choice diagnostic questionnaire which psychiatrists use to measure the presence and severity of mania and associated symptoms. The scale was originally developed for use in the evaluation of adult patients with bipolar disorder, but has since been adapted for use in pediatric patients. The scale is widely used by clinicians and researchers in the diagnosis, evaluation, and quantification of manic symptomology. 

A similar scale was later developed to allow clinicians to interview parents about their children's symptoms, in order to ascertain a better diagnosis of mania in children. This parent version (P-YMRS) can be completed by a parent or a teacher to determine whether a child should receive further evaluation from a psychologist or psychiatrist. Clinical studies have demonstrated the reliability and validity of the parent version of the scale, which has been found to provide “clinically meaningful information about mood disorders in youth." The P-YMRS does succeed in identifying most cases of childhood bipolar disorder, but it has an extremely high false positive rate.

See also
Diagnostic classification and rating scales used in psychiatry

References

External links
 Online version of P-YMRS
 
 
 EffectiveChildTherapy.Org information on bipolar disorders
Society of Clinical Child and Adolescent Psychology

Bipolar disorder
Depression (mood)
Mental disorders screening and assessment tools
Mood disorders
Screening and assessment tools in child and adolescent psychiatry
Mania screening and assessment tools
Treatment of bipolar disorder